Kirsten-Andrea Weedon (born 18 February 1989) is a Guatemalan tennis player.

She has a career-high WTA singles ranking of 608, achieved on 5 August 2019. She also has a career-high doubles ranking of world No. 634, reached on 24 September 2018.

Playing for Guatemala Fed Cup team, Weedon has a win–loss record of 37–29.

ITF Circuit finals

Singles: 2 (2 runner–ups)

Doubles: 8 (2 titles, 6 runner–ups)

External links
 
 
 

1989 births
Living people
Guatemalan female tennis players
Tennis players at the 2019 Pan American Games
Central American and Caribbean Games bronze medalists for Guatemala
Central American and Caribbean Games medalists in tennis
Tennis players at the 2007 Pan American Games
Tennis players at the 2015 Pan American Games
Pan American Games competitors for Guatemala